Diego Dublé Almeyda (1841 – May 6, 1922) was a Chilean Army officer. From 1874 to 1878 he was governor of governor of Punta Arenas in the Straits of Magellan. In 1876 he travelled on board of Chacabuco to Port Stanley in the Falkland Islands where he bought 300 sheep he then sold to Henry Reynard, contributing to beginning the Patagonian sheep farming boom.

References

1841 births
1922 deaths
People from Valparaíso
Chilean people of French descent
Governors of Magallanes
Chilean Army officers
Chilean Freemasons
Instituto Nacional General José Miguel Carrera alumni
Chilean military personnel of the Chincha Islands War
Chilean military personnel of the War of the Pacific
People of the Chilean Civil War of 1891 (Balmacedistas)